Shoffner is a surname. People with that name include:
 Bob Shoffner (190083), American jazz trumpeter
 John Shoffner
 Martha Shoffner (born 1944 or 45), American politician in Arkansas
 Milt Shoffner (190578), American Major League Baseball pitcher
 Wilson Allen Shoffner (19382014), lieutenant general in the U.S. Army

See also 
 Shoffner Act, passed in 1870 by the North Carolina General Assembly, named after State Senator T. M. Shoffner